In the celestial equatorial coordinate system Σ(α, δ) in astronomy, polar distance (PD) is an angular distance of a celestial object on its meridian measured from the celestial pole, similar to the way declination (dec, δ) is measured from the celestial equator.

Definition

Polar distance in celestial navigation is the angle  between the pole and the Position of body on its Declination.

Referring to diagram:

P- Pole    , WQE- Equator   ,  Z - Zenith of observer ,

Y- Lower meridian passage of body

X- Upper meridian passage of body

Here body will be on declination circle ( XY). The distance between PY or PX  will be the Polar distance of the body.

NP=ZQ=Latitude of observer

NY and NX will be the True altitude of body at that instant.

Polar distance (PD) = 90° ± δ

Polar distances are expressed in degrees and cannot exceed 180° in magnitude. An object on the celestial equator has a PD of 90°.

Polar distance is affected by the precession of the equinoxes.

If the polar distance of the Sun is equal to the observer's latitude, the shadow path of a gnomon's tip on a sundial will be a parabola; at higher latitudes it will be an ellipse and lower, a hyperbola.

References

Astronomical coordinate systems
Angle